Khagaraj Adhikari is a nepalese politician and was Minister of Home Affairs  of Government of Nepal. He served in this post since 4 June 2021 but was removed from the post by Supreme Court on 22 June 2021 making the tenure of just 18 days and shortest tenure till date. He is a member of Communist Party of Nepal (Unified Marxist-Leninist), He also assumed the post of the Minister of Health and Population of Nepal on 25 February 2014 under Sushil Koirala-led government.He is mostly known for Launching Government Health insurance plan.

Books 
An autobiography of Adhikari Maya Mareko Manchhe was published in 2014 co-authored with Shikhar Ghimirey.

References

Living people
Communist Party of Nepal (Unified Marxist–Leninist) politicians
Government ministers of Nepal
Nepal MPs 2017–2022
Nepal Communist Party (NCP) politicians
Nepal MPs 1994–1999
1962 births
Members of the Provincial Assembly of Gandaki Province
Chief Ministers of Nepalese provinces